Seputar Peristiwa is a television program on RCTI. This program reveals the facts in the form of events surrounding the events both in Indonesia and the world. This program is broadcast by RCTI every Monday to Friday at 12:30 to 13:00 WIB.

Seputar Peristiwa has won the 2012 Panasonic Gobel Awards for the News Magazine Program category in 2012.

Hosts 

 Dian Mirza

Achievement

References 

Indonesian television news shows
Indonesian-language television shows
2011 Indonesian television series debuts
2010s Indonesian television series
2011 Indonesian television series endings
RCTI original programming